Anti-Tibetan sentiment refers to fear, dislike, hostility, and racism towards Tibetan people or anything related to Tibetan culture in general. Anti-Tibetan sentiment has been present in various regions of Bhutan, China, India, and Nepal at various points in time. Anti-Tibetan sentiment in South Asia is due to the presence of Tibetan immigrants in those countries. Anti-Tibetan sentiment in China is due to the fact that Tibet has been annexed by China on several occasions over the centuries (Tibet is currently under the administration of the People's Republic of China) which has created tension between the Tibetans and the Han Chinese.

Bhutan
The government of Bhutan agreed to take in 4000 Tibetan refugees. Ordinary Bhutanese became increasingly resentful of the Tibetan refugees because of their refusal to assimilate into Bhutanese culture.

China 
Ever since its inception, the Chinese Communist Party (CCP), the sole legal ruling political party of the PRC (including Tibet), has been distributing historical documents which portray Tibetan culture as barbaric in order to justify Chinese control of the territory of Tibet. As such, many members of Chinese society have a negative view of Tibet which can be interpreted as racism. The traditional view is that Tibet was historically a feudal society which practiced serfdom/slavery and that this only changed due to Chinese influence in the region.

The CCP also promotes the view that some ancient Chinese historical figures strongly influenced many aspects of Tibet's fundamental culture as part of its campaign to legitimize Chinese control of Tibet. One such figure is Princess Wencheng, an ancient Chinese princess who purportedly married king Songsten Gampo of Tibet and introduced Buddhism as well as many other forms of "civilization" to Tibet. Evidence for the legitimacy of the claims made about Princess Wencheng is limited.

Some extremists in China believe that the Han Chinese, Tibetans, and Mongols belong to the same ethnic group and/or race and that their differences are only regional rather than genetic.

India
In Arunachal Pradesh, a region bordering Tibet and is claimed by China as being South Tibet, there was a xenophobic campaign and a motion by the state government to expel around 12,000 Tibetans that received much support from the local population, but the Indian government was "angered" by the state government's initiatives.

The Monpas, a people who are ethnically and culturally related to Tibetans, are opposed to Tibetan refugees in their state.
Nevertheless all Tibetans are currently peacefully settled.

Nepal
Tibetans and Himalayan ethnic groups of Tibetan origin such as the Sherpa and Tamang are at times derogatorily called "bhotey", which is the Nepali word for someone from Tibet, but is used as a slur.

References

Tibetan people
Tibet
Anti-indigenous racism